The Stampede Pacific Heavyweight Championship was a professional wrestling title, the first secondary title to be created following the reopening of Stampede Wrestling in 1999. The title was defended over a two-year period before being abandoned in late 2001. Title defenses were held primarily in Alberta as well in the United States and Japan. There have been a total of four recognized champions who have had a combined five official reigns.

Title history

Notes

References

Stampede Wrestling championships
Heavyweight wrestling championships
Regional professional wrestling championships